Live in Atlantic City is a live album and home video release by American rock band Heart, recorded during their concert at the Trump Taj Majal in Atlantic City for VH1's Decades Rock Live! show on March 10, 2006. The concert features guest appearances by Alice in Chains, Gretchen Wilson, Rufus Wainwright, Carrie Underwood, Dave Navarro, Phil Anselmo and Duff McKagan. It was released on CD, LP, DVD, Blu-ray, streaming and digital download on January 25, 2019, through earMUSIC.

This concert marked the first time that William DuVall performed with Alice in Chains as a guest vocalist. Following the concert, DuVall toured with the band and became their official co-lead vocalist and rhythm guitarist.

Track listing

DVD and Blu-ray also include:
 Bonus: Heart Confidential

Personnel

Heart
 Ann Wilson – lead and backing vocals, acoustic guitar, flute
 Nancy Wilson – backing vocals, lead and rhythm guitars, acoustic guitar, mandolin
 Craig Bartock – guitars
 Mike Inez – bass guitar
 Debbie Shair – keyboards
 Ben Smith – drums, percussion

Alice in Chains
 Jerry Cantrell – guitar and vocals
 Sean Kinney – drums
 Mike Inez – bass
 William DuVall – vocals
 Phil Anselmo – vocals
 Duff McKagan – guitar
 Management by Bill Siddons, Susan Silver, Jordan Yousem
 Production crew – Rem Massingil, Tavis LeMay, Jason Stockwell
Production
 Executive producer – Barry Summers
 Co-executive producer – Eric Sherman
 Directed by Milton Lage
 Musical director – Nancy Wilson
 Edited by Marc Schrobilgen
 Heart Management by Sacha Guzy
 FOH engineer – James Geddes
 Monitor engineer – Nathan Payne
 Audio engineer – Keith Windhorst
 Instrument techs – Jeff Ousley, Jason Stockwell, Jeff Diffner
 Carpenter/equipment manager/teleprompter – Joel Bennett
 Original mix by Peter A. Parker, Nancy Wilson, Craig Bartock, Jerry Cantrell and Sean Kinney
 Mix and mastered by Eike Freese, Chameleon Studios, Hamburg
 Recorded live during Decades Rock Live in Atlantic City, March 10, 2006

Charts

References

External links
 

2019 live albums
2019 video albums
Heart (band) live albums
Live video albums
Events in Atlantic City, New Jersey